The Bashkir Autonomous Soviet Socialist Republic (Bashkirskaya Avtonomnaya Sovetskaya Sotsialisticheskaya Respublika), also historically known as Soviet Bashkiria or simply Bashkiria, was an autonomous republic of the Russian SFSR. Currently it is known as Republic of Bashkortostan, a federal subject of Russia. The Bashkir ASSR was the first Autonomous Soviet Socialist Republic in the RSFSR.

The region was settled by nomads of the steppe, the Turkic Bashkirs, during the 13th-century domination by the Golden Horde. Russians arrived in the mid-16th century, founding the city of Ufa, now the republic's capital. Numerous local uprisings broke out in opposition to the settlement of larger Russian populations in the centuries that followed. The Bashkirs finally gave up nomadic life in the 19th century, adopting the agricultural lifestyle that remains their primary means of support. The traditional clan-based social structure has largely disappeared. The predominant religions of the Bashkir population are Islam, which is observed by the majority, and Russian Orthodoxy. A major battleground of the Russian Civil War, in 1919 the Bashkir Republic was the first ethnic region to be designated an autonomous republic of Russia under the new communist government. The republic declared its sovereignty within the Soviet Union on 11 October 1990 as Bashkir Soviet Socialist Republic, and in 1992 it declared full independence. Two years later, Bashkortostan agreed to remain within the legislative framework of the Russian Federation, provided that mutual areas of competence were agreed upon.

The republic has rich mineral resources, especially petroleum, natural gas, iron ore, manganese, copper, salt, and construction stone. The Soviet government built a variety of heavy industries on that resource base. The traditional Bashkir occupations of livestock raising and beekeeping remain important economic activities.

See also
 First Secretary of the Bashkir Communist Party

References

 
 - Soviet Union

External links
 World Statesmen

Autonomous republics of the Russian Soviet Federative Socialist Republic
States and territories established in 1919
Former socialist republics
1919 establishments in Russia
1990 disestablishments in the Soviet Union